Mashti Mamdali's Car (Māšīn-e Maštī Mamdalī)  is a 1974 Iranian Persian-genre action comedy film directed by Reza Fazeli and starring Reza Fazeli, Parvin Malakouti, Mansour Sepehrnia, Nooshafarin, Shahrashoob, Kamal Motiei, Mastaneh Jazayeri, Nematollah Gorji, and Ali Zahedi.

References

1974 films
1970s action comedy films
Iranian comedy films
1974 directorial debut films
1974 comedy films